"It's Over Now" is the lead single by 112's from third album, Part III, and their first number-one R&B single, peaking at number one on the Billboard Hot R&B/Hip-Hop Singles & Tracks for two weeks. Slim and Daron share lead vocals on the song.

The song contains an interpolation of Grandmaster Flash & The Furious Five's song "White Lines (Don't Don't Do It)", which was also used by the hip hop group Mobb Deep for their biggest hit "Quiet Storm" released over a year prior to "It's Over Now".

The song itself was interpolated by English singer Ellie Goulding on the song "We Can't Move To This" off of her third studio album, Delirium.

Charts

Weekly charts

Year-end charts

References 

2001 singles
112 (band) songs
Bad Boy Records singles
Songs written by Daron Jones
Songs written by Sylvia Robinson
2000 songs
Songs written by Quinnes Parker